Ufa State Aviation Technical University (USATU) is a state higher school, located in Ufa, Bashkortostan, Russia. Ufa State Aviation Technical University was founded in 1932 in Rybinsk, USSR (moved to Ufa during WWII). Nowadays, Ufa State Aviation Technical University has become the one of leading higher educational institutions of Russia and represents a large scientific and educational complex. There are 18 areas of study and 40 programs in its 7 faculties (full-time and by correspondence).

More than 20,000 students study at the university.

See also
 Education in Russia
 List of universities in Russia

Notes

External links
 Ufa State Aviation Technical University Official Site

Universities in Bashkortostan
Educational institutions established in 1932
Education in Ufa
1932 establishments in the Soviet Union
Technical universities and colleges in Russia
Aviation in the Soviet Union